The Lords of Trade and Plantations was a permanent administrative body formed by Charles II in 1675 to provide consistent advice to the Privy Council regarding the management of the growing number of English colonies. It replaced a series of temporary committees which had been set up to run the colonies since 1624. Following the Restoration of Charles II there were separate committees for trade and plantations until 1672, when a committee combining both remits was established. In 1675, named the Lords of Trade and Plantations, the committee had gained a more stable form. It was replaced by the Commissioners for Trade and Plantations in 1696.

Original appointees
The following people were appointed on 12 March 1675:
 Earl of Danby
 Earl of Anglesey
 Duke of Lauderdale
 Duke of Ormond
 Marquess of Worcester
 Earl of Ossory
 Earl of Arlington
 Earl of Bridgwater
 Earl of Essex
 Earl of Carlisle
 Earl of Craven
 Viscount of Fauconberg
 Viscount of Halifax
 Lord of Berkeley of Stratton
 Lord Holles
 Henry Savile
 Hon. Henry Coventry
 Sir Joseph Williamson
 Sir John Duncombe 
 Sir R. Carr
 Sir Edward Seymour

References

Further reading

1675 establishments in England
1696 disestablishments in England
Privy Council of England
Trade in England